Jam'iyyah Ahlith Thariqah al-Mu'tabarah an-Nahdliyyah or abbreviated as JATMAN is an Indonesian religious organization whose members focus on practicing the teachings of the tariqa.

JATMAN was founded in Tegalrejo, Magelang Regency, on October 10, 1957 under the name Jam'iyyah Ahlith Thariqah al-Mu'tabarah (the Association of Recognized Sufi Orders) by a number of senior tariqa kiai who are all affiliated with Nahdlatul Ulama with the aim for uniting all of al-Ṭarīqah al-Mu‘tabarah (recognized Sufi orders) in order to maintain common interest. With the word al-Ṭarīqah al-Mu‘tabarah it means that the tariqa concerned observes the shari'a and included in the creed of Sunni Islam, and must have a legal silsila, that is continuous until the Islamic prophet Muhammad himself. Thus Jam'iyyah wanted to distinguish himself clearly from the kebatinan and other syncretistic mysticism movements, which were not included in Sunni.

References

Footnotes

Bibliography

Further reading

External links
 Official website

Islamic organizations based in Indonesia